Devereaux "Dev" Jennings was an American cinematographer who was active in Hollywood primarily during the silent era.

Select filmography
Born to the West (1937)
Stranger in Town (1932)
The Famous Ferguson Case (1931)
Manhattan Parade (1931)
Side Show (1931)
The Public Enemy (1931)
50 Million Frenchmen (1931)
Finn and Hattie (1931)
Divorce Among Friends (1930) 
The Life of the Party (1930)
Golden Dawn (1930)
Hold Everything (1930)
Dumbbells in Ermine (1930)
Sally (1929)
Vamping Venus (1928)
Steamboat Bill, Jr. (1928)
The General (1926)
Steel Preferred (1925)
Those Who Dare (1924)
Children of Jazz (1923)
 The Glory of Clementina (1922)
Madame X (1920)
The Bride of Fear (1918)
One Touch of Sin (1917)
The Winged Idol (1915)

References

1884 births
1952 deaths
American cinematographers